Anodendron is a genus of plant in the family Apocynaceae first described as a genus in 1844. It is native to most of tropical Asia: China, the Indian subcontinent, Southeast Asia, New Guinea, and some islands of the western Pacific.

Species
, Plants of the World Online accepted the following species:
 Anodendron affine (Hook. & Arn.) Druce - China (Fujian, Guangdong, Guangxi, Guizhou, Hainan, Hubei, Hunan, Sichuan, Taiwan, Yunnan, Zhejiang), Japan, Ryukyu Islands, Philippines, Vietnam, Laos, Thailand, Myanmar, Bangladesh
 Anodendron axillare Merr. - Philippines, Borneo, W Malaysia, Java, Sumatra
 Anodendron benthamianum Hemsl. - Taiwan
 Anodendron borneense (King & Gamble) D.J.Middleton - Borneo, Palawan
 Anodendron candolleanum Wight - Thailand, W Malaysia, Borneo, Java, Sumatra, Philippines 
 Anodendron coriaceum (Blume) Miq. - Thailand, W Malaysia, Borneo, Java, Bali, Lombok, Timor, Flores
 Anodendron gracile (King & Gamble) D.J.Middleton - Borneo, Palawan, W Malaysia
 Anodendron howii Tsiang - Guangxi, Hainan
 Anodendron nervosum Kerr - Yunnan, Assam, Laos, Thailand, Vietnam, Java, Sumatra
 Anodendron oblongifolium Hemsl. - Borneo, Philippines, Maluku, New Guinea, Bismarck Archipelago, Solomon Islands, Vanuatu 
 Anodendron parviflorum (Roxb.) I.M.Turner – tropical Asia
 Anodendron pauciflorum Hook.f - Borneo, W Malaysia, Sumatra
 Anodendron punctatum Tsiang - Cambodia, Thailand, Guangxi, Hainan, Sichuan
 Anodendron seramense D.J.Middleton - Maluku
 Anodendron tubulosum (Ridl. ex Burkill & M.R.Hend.) D.J.Middleton - W Malaysia, Sumatra
 Anodendron whitmorei D.J.Middleton - Maluku, New Guinea, Solomon Islands
 Anodendron wrayi King & Gamble - W Malaysia

References

 
Taxonomy articles created by Polbot